The Ceiba stream frog (Atlantihyla spinipollex)  is a species of frog in the family Hylidae endemic to Honduras. Its natural habitats are subtropical or tropical moist lowland forests, subtropical or tropical moist montane forests, and rivers. It is threatened by habitat loss.

In 2020, a population of frogs believed to be the Ceiba stream frog was described as a new species, Atlantihyla melissa. This new species is a sister species to the Ceiba stream frog.

References 

Atlantihyla
Frogs of North America
Amphibians of Honduras
Endemic fauna of Honduras
Endangered fauna of North America
Amphibians described in 1936
Taxa named by Karl Patterson Schmidt
Taxonomy articles created by Polbot